Trinidadian and Tobagonian British people are citizens or residents of the United Kingdom whose ethnic origins lie fully or partially in Trinidad and Tobago.

History and settlement

The largest wave of Trinidadian and Tobagonian people to the UK was in the mid 20th century, when Caribbeans and people from former British Colonies were encouraged to move to the UK for work, although there was Trinidadian migration to the UK before and continues after. The UK, United States, Canada and other Anglophone countries in the Western World prove most popular for Trinidadian emigrants, due to the close language links (English being the most common language in all countries, including Trinidad and Tobago). The UK and Trinidad and Tobago maintain close links, especially since Trinidad and Tobago was once part of the British Empire and remains in the Commonwealth of Nations.

Demographics

Population
21,283 Trinidad and Tobago-born people were living in the UK at the time of the 2001 Census. The 2011 Census recorded 22,872 Trinidad and Tobago-born residents in England and Wales. The censuses of Scotland and Northern Ireland recorded 663 and 62 Trinidad and Tobago-born residents respectively. More recent estimates by the Office for National Statistics put the figure at 25,000 in 2013.

Culture and community

Music

The  carried 492 passengers from Jamaica, including Lord Kitchener, a calypso singer from Trinidad. By chance, a local newsreel company filmed him singing "London Is The Place For Me" as he disembarked from the ship. In 2002, "London Is The Place For Me: Trinidadian Calypso, 1950-1956" was finally released in Britain. The 1951 Festival of Britain brought the Trinidad All Steel Percussion Orchestra (TAPSO) and Roaring Lion to public attention. The smart set in Oxford and Cambridge adopted both calypso and steelband for debutante parties. In 1959, Trinidadian Claudia Jones started the Notting Hill Carnival. They brought Mighty Sparrow and others directly from Trinidad. Edric Connor had arrived in England from Trinidad in 1944. He starred in a West End musical called "Calypso" in 1948. A white Danish duo, Nina and Frederick, recorded several calypsos from 1958 to 1962, scoring in the charts. Cy Grant (from Guyana) sang a song by Lord Kitchener in the TV drama "A Man From the Sun" in 1956. It told the story of Caribbean migrants. From 1957 to 1960, Cy Grant sang calypsos on the BBC TV news programme Tonight. In 1962, English comedian Bernard Cribbins had a hit with "Gossip Calypso".

Notable individuals

See also 

 Trinidad and Tobago–United Kingdom relations
 Black British people
 British Indians

References

External links 

 
Caribbean British
British